A nanofluid is a fluid containing nanometer-sized particles, called nanoparticles. These fluids are engineered colloidal suspensions of nanoparticles in a base fluid. The nanoparticles used in nanofluids are typically made of metals, oxides, carbides, or carbon nanotubes. Common base fluids include water, ethylene glycol and oil.

Nanofluids have novel properties that make them potentially useful in many applications in heat transfer, including microelectronics, fuel cells, pharmaceutical processes, and hybrid-powered engines, engine cooling/vehicle thermal management, domestic refrigerator, chiller, heat exchanger, in grinding, machining and in boiler flue gas temperature reduction. They exhibit enhanced thermal conductivity and the convective heat transfer coefficient compared to the base fluid. Knowledge of the rheological behaviour of nanofluids is found to be critical in deciding their suitability for convective heat transfer applications.
Nanofluids also have special acoustical properties and in ultrasonic fields display additional shear-wave reconversion of an incident compressional wave; the effect becomes more pronounced as concentration increases.

In analysis such as computational fluid dynamics (CFD), nanofluids can be assumed to be single phase fluids; however, almost all new academic papers use a two-phase assumption. Classical theory of single phase fluids can be applied, where physical properties of nanofluid is taken as a function of properties of both constituents and their concentrations. An alternative approach simulates nanofluids using a two-component model.

The spreading of a nanofluid droplet is enhanced by the solid-like ordering structure of nanoparticles assembled near the contact line by diffusion, which gives rise to a structural disjoining pressure in the vicinity of the contact line. However, such enhancement is not observed for small droplets with diameter of nanometer scale, because the wetting time scale is much smaller than the diffusion time scale.

Synthesis
Nanofluids are produced by several techniques:
 Direct Evaporation (1 step)
 Gas condensation/dispersion (2 step)
 Chemical vapour condensation (1 step)
 Chemical precipitation (1 step)
 Bio-based (2 step)
Several liquids including water, ethylene glycol, and oils have been used as base fluids. Although stabilization can be a challenge, on-going research indicates that it is possible. Nano-materials used so far in nanofluid synthesis include metallic particles, oxide particles, carbon nanotubes, graphene nano-flakes and ceramic particles.

A bio-based, environmentally friendly approach for the covalent functionalization of multi-walled carbon nanotubes (MWCNTs) using clove buds was developed. There are no any toxic and hazardous acids which are typically used in common carbon nanomaterial functionalization procedures, employed in this synthesis. The MWCNTs are functionalized in one pot using a free radical grafting reaction. The clove-functionalized MWCNTs are then dispersed in distilled water (DI water), producing a highly stable MWCNT aqueous suspension (MWCNTs Nanofluid).

Smart cooling nanofluids
Realizing the modest thermal conductivity enhancement in conventional nanofluids, a team of researchers at Indira Gandhi Centre for Atomic Research Centre, Kalpakkam developed a new class of magnetically polarizable nanofluids where the thermal conductivity enhancement up to 300% of basefluids is demonstrated.  Fatty-acid-capped magnetite nanoparticles of different sizes (3-10 nm) have been synthesized for this purpose.  It has been shown that both the thermal and rheological properties of such magnetic nanofluids are tunable by varying the magnetic field strength and orientation with respect to the direction of heat flow.  Such response stimuli fluids are reversibly switchable and have applications in miniature devices such as micro- and nano-electromechanical systems.
In 2013, Azizian et al. considered the effect of an external magnetic field on the convective heat transfer coefficient of water-based magnetite nanofluid experimentally under laminar flow regime. Up to 300% enhancement obtained at Re=745 and magnetic field gradient of 32.5 mT/mm. The effect of the magnetic field on the pressure drop was not as significant.

Response stimuli nanofluids for sensing applications
Researchers have invented a nanofluid-based ultrasensitive optical sensor that changes its colour on exposure to extremely low concentrations of toxic cations. The sensor is useful in detecting minute traces of cations in industrial and environmental samples.  Existing techniques for monitoring cations levels in industrial and environmental samples are expensive, complex and time-consuming. The sensor is designed with a magnetic nanofluid that consists of nano-droplets with magnetic grains suspended in water. At a fixed magnetic field, a light source illuminates the nanofluid where the colour of the nanofluid changes depending on the cation concentration. This color change occurs within a second after exposure to cations, much faster than other existing cation sensing methods.

Such response stimulus nanofluids are also used to detect and image defects in ferromagnetic components. The photonic eye, as it has been called, is based on a magnetically polarizable nano-emulsion that changes colour when it comes into contact with a defective region in a sample. The device might be used to monitor structures such as rail tracks and pipelines.

Magnetically responsive photonic crystals nanofluids 
Magnetic nanoparticle clusters or magnetic nanobeads with the size 80–150 nanometers form ordered structures along the direction of the external magnetic field with a regular interparticle spacing on the order of hundreds of nanometers resulting in strong diffraction of visible light in suspension.

Nanolubricants 
Another word used to describe nanoparticle based suspensions is Nanolubricants. They are mainly prepared using oils used for engine and machine lubrication. So far several materials including metals, oxides and allotropes of carbon have been used to formulate nanolubricants. The addition of nanomaterials mainly enhances the thermal conductivity and anti-wear property of base oils. Although MoS2, graphene, Cu based fluids have been studied extensively, the fundamental understanding of underlying mechanisms is still needed.

Molybdenum disulfide (MoS2) and graphene work as third body lubricants, essentially becoming tiny microscopic ball bearings, which reduce the friction between two contacting surfaces. This mechanism is beneficial if a sufficient supply of these particles are present at the contact interface. The beneficial effects are diminished as the rubbing mechanism pushes out the third body lubricants. Changing the lubricant, like-wise, will null the effects of the nanolubricants drained with the oil.

Other nanolubricant approaches, such as Magnesium Silicate Hydroxides (MSH) rely on nanoparticle coatings by synthesizing nanomaterials with adhesive and lubricating functionalities. Research into nanolubricant coatings has been conducted in both the academic and industrial spaces. Nanoborate additives as well as mechanical model descriptions of diamond-like carbon (DLC) coating formations have been developed by Ali Erdemir at Argonne National Labs. Companies such as TriboTEX provide consumer formulations of synthesized MSH nanomaterial coatings for vehicle engines and industrial applications.

Nanofluids in petroleum refining process
Many researches claim that nanoparticles can be used to enhance crude oil recovery. It is evident that development of nanofluids for oil and gas industry has a great practical aspects.

Applications
Nanofluids are primarily used for their enhanced thermal properties as coolants in heat transfer equipment such as heat exchangers, electronic cooling system(such as flat plate) and radiators. Heat transfer over flat plate has been analyzed by many researchers. However, they are also useful for their controlled optical properties. Graphene based nanofluid has been found to enhance Polymerase chain reaction efficiency. Nanofluids in solar collectors is another application where nanofluids are employed for their tunable optical properties. Nanofluids have also been explored to enhance thermal desalination technologies, by altering thermal conductivity and absorbing sunlight, but surface fouling of the nanofluids poses a major risk to those approaches. Researchers proposed nanofluids for electronics cooling. Nanofluids also can be used in machining.

Thermophysical properties of nanofluids 
Thermal conductivity, viscosity, density, specific heat, and surface tension are considered some main thermophysical properties of nanofluids. Various parameters like nanoparticle type, size, and shape, volume concentration, fluid temperature, and nanofluid preparation method have effect on thermophysical properties of nanofluids. 
Viscosity of nanofluids
Density of nanofluids
Thermal conductivity of nanofluids

Nanoparticle migration 

The early studies indicating anomalous increases in nanofluid thermal properties over those of the base fluid, particularly the heat transfer coefficient, have been largely discredited. One of the main conclusions taken from a study involving over thirty labs throughout the world was that "no anomalous enhancement of thermal conductivity was observed in the limited set of nanofluids tested in this exercise".  The COST funded research programme, Nanouptake (COST Action CA15119) was founded with the intention "to develop and foster the use of nanofluids as advanced heat transfer/thermal storage materials to increase the efficiency of heat exchange and storage systems". One of the final outcomes, involving an experimental study in five different labs, concluded that "there are no anomalous or unexplainable effects".

Despite these apparently conclusive experimental investigations theoretical papers continue to follow the claim of anomalous enhancement, see, particularly via Brownian and thermophoretic mechanisms, as suggested by Buongiorno. Brownian diffusion is due to the random drifting of suspended nanoparticles in the base fluid which originates from collisions between the nanoparticles and liquid molecules. Thermophoresis induces nanoparticle migration from warmer to colder regions, again due to collisions with liquid molecules. The mismatch between experimental and theoretical results is explained in Myers et al. In particular it is shown that Brownian motion and thermophoresis effects are too small to have any significant effect: their role is often amplified in theoretical studies due to the use of incorrect parameter values. Brownian diffusion as a cause for enhanced heat transfer is dismissed in the discussion of the use of nanofluids in solar collectors.

See also 
 Argonne National Laboratory
 Flow battery
 Fluid dynamics
 Heat transfer
 Nanophase material
 Surface-area-to-volume ratio
 Surfactant
 Therminol

References

External links 
 Magnetically responsive photonic crystals nanofluid (video) produced by Nanos scientificae
European projects:
 NanoHex is a European project developing industrial-class nanofluid coolants

Nanoparticles
Fluid mechanics
Heat transfer
Nanomaterials